Euploea eunice, commonly called blue-banded king crow, is a butterfly found in the Indomalayan realm  that belongs to the crows and tigers, that is, the Danaid group of the brush-footed butterflies family.

The larva feeds  on Ficus,  Flacourtia rukam, Streblus asper

Subspecies
E. e. eunice Philippines, Guam, Japan, Malacca, Java, Sumatra, Formosa
 E. e. novarae   (Felder, 1862)  Nicobars, Andamans 
 E. e.  vestigiata  Butler, 1866  Java, Sumatra
 E. e.  hobsoni  (Butler, 1877)  Taiwan
 E. e. leucogonis  (Butler, 1879)  Thailand, Peninsular Malaya, Langkawi, Singapore
 E. e. meizon  (Doherty, 1891)  Sumba
 E. e.  phane  (Doherty, 1891)  Enggano
 E. e. juno   (Stichel, 1899)  Nias
 E. e. coelestis   (Fruhstorfer, 1902)  Laos, North Vietnam, Haina, Southeast China
 E. e. syra   (Fruhstorfer, 1902)  Borneo, Palawan
 E. e. tisais   (Fruhstorfer, 1902)  Lombok
 E. e. kandaon  Fruhstorfer, 1910  Sumbawa
 E. e. relucida  Fruhstorfer, 1910  Bali
 E. e. timaius  Fruhstorfer, 1910  Bawean

See also
Danainae
Nymphalidae
List of butterflies of India
List of butterflies of India (Nymphalidae)

References
 

Euploea
Butterflies of Asia
Butterflies of Indochina
Butterflies described in 1819
Taxa named by Jean-Baptiste Godart